Straszewo , formerly an independent village, is a neighbourhood in Wągrowiec, Greater Poland Voivodeship, in west-central Poland.

Initially called Jasiniak, it used to belong in the middle ages to the Łekno Cistercian monastery. It is currently the most populous residential neighbourhood of the town.

References

Neighbourhoods in Poland
Wągrowiec County
Poznań Voivodeship (1921–1939)